Peter Neumann may refer to:

Peter Neumann (Canadian football) (1931–2020), Canadian football player
Peter G. Neumann (born 1932), computer scientist
Peter M. Neumann (1940-2020), British mathematician
Peter R. Neumann (born 1974), political scientist

See also
Peter de Neumann (1917–1972), British sailor, convicted pirate and dockmaster
Peter Newman (disambiguation)